The HSC Champion Jet 1 is an 86m fast catamaran ferry operated by Seajets Ferries. She was until early 2015 owned by Condor Ferries and called HSC Condor Vitesse.

History

Condor Vitesse was built in 1997 at the Incat Yards in Tasmania, Australia as Incat 044 but was not ordered by any ferry company.  She was sent to Europe and arrived in July 1997 at Portland and was later moved to Århus, Denmark. By moving the vessel to Europe, Incat hoped that she would attract a buyer.  In late 1997 Condor Ferries announced that they would again run services from Weymouth in 1998. The service was to operate to Guernsey and St Malo using the Condor 10 but in March 1998 Condor Ferries announced they would charter the Incat 044 and rename her Condor Vitesse for the new service. The charter had the option to purchase which was later taken up. 

She operated in 1998 at a reduced passenger capacity of 500 passengers and 90 cars in order to provide space to transfer passengers from the Condor Express Poole-Channel Islands service should the need arise.  Condor Express had suffered a number of mechanical problems during her first year in service in 1997 and also during 1998, these problems meant that the Condor Vitesse had to move to the Poole-Channel Islands service a number of times during that year. During the winter of 1999 Condor Vitesse was chartered to Tranz Rail for the Interisland Line service and carried the marketing name of The Lynx. She returned to Europe for the summer to continue operating for Condor Ferries. 

In 2001 Condor Ferries and Brittany Ferries entered into an agreement to run a Poole-Cherbourg fastcraft service. Condor Vitesse was chosen for this service, possibly because of her French sounding name, and she began sailing on the route in May 2001 as well as operating for Condor Ferries in the afternoon between Poole and St Malo calling at one of the Channel Islands on the way.  The fastcraft service was great success carrying double what was predicted.  The summer operation pattern was a morning round trip between Poole and Cherbourg then an afternoon round trip to St Malo. In 2003 her livery was modified with the application of the new Condor Ferries and Brittany Ferries logos, it was altered again in 2007 when three flags were painted on the ship's side forward of the bridge.  The flags are those of Jersey, Guernsey and St Malo.

On 14 January 2015, it was announced that she would be sold to Greek firm Seajets for an undisclosed sum with her sister-ship HSC Condor Express, owing to her replacement by HSC Condor Liberation. She was delivered to her new owner in late-February 2015, who renamed her HSC Champion Jet 1.

Incidents 
Condor Vitesse was holed after colliding with the jetty in St Malo on 22 March 2008.

On 28 March 2011, she was involved in a collision with a fishing boat near the Minquiers whilst en route from St Malo in foggy conditions. A French fisherman died in the collision. Shortly after the incident, the fisherman was identified to be Phillippe Claude Lesaulnier, aged 42. A report into the collision was published in October 2011.

Condor Vitesse in Brittany Ferries marketing
Brittany Ferries used a variety of marketing names for the vessel in its publicity and ticketing.  The ship has been advertised as Brittany Ferries Condor Vitesse and Vitesse.  From 2005 she was referred to as Normandie Vitesse except in the Brittany Ferries information leaflet for the ship which referred to her as Vitesse.

Condor Vitesse carried small Brittany Ferries branding on both sides towards the stern.  In Brittany Ferries publicity, the positioning of the Condor and Brittany branding was either reversed, or the Condor branding was removed altogether. Condor Vitesse was the first vessel to carry the current Brittany Ferries logo.

Regular routes

Champion Jet 1 operates either routes from Piraeus or Heraklion to the Greek islands 

Oct 2022

Pireaus-Serifos-Sifnos-Milos-Sifnos-Serifos-Pireaus

July 2022 - Sept 2022

Thessaloniki-Lemnos-Mytilini-Lemnos-Thessaloniki (Tuesdays)

June 2022 - Sept 2022

Thessaloniki-Skiathos-Skopelos-Alonnisos-Mantoudi-Alonnisos-Skopelos-Skiathos-Thessaloniki (Mondays,Wednesdays,Friday,Saturday& Sundays)

Apr 2022 - June 2022

Pireaus-Serifos-Sifnos-Milos-Sifnos-Serifos-Pireaus (Daily)

Oct 2021

Pireaus-Serifos-Sifnos-Milos-Sifnos-Serifos-Pireaus

From Sept 2021 - Oct 2021

Heraklion-santorini-Naxos-Mykonos-Paros-Naxos-Ios-Santorini-Heraklion

route from July 2021 - Sept 2021

Thessaloniki-Skiathos-Skopelos-Alonnisos-Mantoudi-Alonnisos-Skopelos-Skiathos-Thessaloniki
(Mondays,Wednesdays,Friday,Saturday& Sundays)

Poole-Cherbourg mid-May to late September/early October 2001 - 2015
Poole-Guernsey/Jersey-St Malo mid-May to late September/early October 2001 - 2015
Poole/Weymouth-Channel Islands (some services continuing to St Malo) rest of the year

Sister ships
Champion Jet 2
Tarifa Jet
Condor Rapide /

References

External links

 86 Metre Wave Piercing Catamaran from incat
 Gallery Aero Photo - Champion Jet1
 Condor Ferries official site

Ships of Seajets
Ships built by Incat
Ferries of the United Kingdom
Ferries of France
Ferries of Greece
Transport in Jersey
Transport in Guernsey
Cook Strait ferries
Incat high-speed craft
1997 ships